Aspromonte National Park is situated in the southern section of the Apennines, in Calabria, Italy. 

The park lies near the sea and includes mountain summits with altitudes close to 2000 meters (Montalto is 1,955 m).

The park's territory, crossed by several watercourses, is populated by important species such as Italian wolf, peregrine falcon, Eurasian eagle-owl and northern goshawk. Most of the territory is dominated by forests of beech, silver fir, black pine, holm oak, sweet chestnut and Mediterranean maquis shrubland. A couple of rare species live here: Bonelli's eagle and a tropical fern, Woodwardia radicans.

Surrounded by the Mediterranean, the park is also rich in historical, artistic and archaeological value.

References
 Yearbook of the Italian Parks 2005, edited by Comunicazione in association with Federparchi and the Italian State Tourism Board

External links
 Pages by the Park Authority on Parks.it

National parks of Italy
Parks in Calabria
Protected areas of the Apennines